Joaquín Mattalia (born 26 April 1992) is an Argentine professional footballer who plays as a goalkeeper for Chaco For Ever.

Career
Mattalia started out in the youth system of Renato Cesarini in 2006, leaving two years later to Boca Juniors; they selected him on the bench three times at the 2012 U-20 Copa Libertadores in Peru; which they won. His departure from the club was completed in 2016, with Primera B Metropolitana side Almirante Brown signing Mattalia. He made his professional debut during a victory away to Talleres on 29 November, which was the first of forty-nine matches across 2016–17 and 2017–18. Mattalia signed with Uruguay's Atenas in July 2018, but terminated his contract in August to go to Independiente Rivadavia.

After zero appearances in Primera B Nacional for Independiente in eighteen months, Mattalia departed at the end of 2019 and subsequently rejoined Almirante Brown in Primera B Metropolitana. He'd play five matches for them, prior to the season's curtailment due to the COVID-19 pandemic. August 2020 saw Mattalia head to Torneo Federal A side Sarmiento.

Personal life
Pablo Mattalia is the brother of Joaquín, he is a fellow professional footballer.

Career statistics
.

Honours
Boca Juniors
U-20 Copa Libertadores: 2012

References

External links

1992 births
Living people
Sportspeople from Córdoba Province, Argentina
Argentine footballers
Association football goalkeepers
Argentine expatriate footballers
Expatriate footballers in Uruguay
Argentine expatriate sportspeople in Uruguay
Primera B Metropolitana players
Primera Nacional players
Club Almirante Brown footballers
Atenas de San Carlos players
Independiente Rivadavia footballers
Sarmiento de Resistencia footballers
Chacarita Juniors footballers
Club Comunicaciones footballers
Chaco For Ever footballers